Anna Mary Robertson Moses (September 7, 1860 – December 13, 1961), or Grandma Moses, was an American folk artist. She began painting in earnest at the age of 78 and is a prominent example of a newly successful art career at an advanced age. Moses gained popularity during the 1950s, having been featured on a cover of Time Magazine in 1953, was a subject of numerous television programs and of a 1950 Oscar-nominated biographical documentary. Her autobiography, titled My Life's History, was published in 1952. She was also awarded two honorary doctoral degrees.

Moses was a live-in housekeeper for a total of 15 years, starting at age 12. An employer noticed her appreciation for their prints made by Currier and Ives, and they supplied her with drawing materials. Moses and her husband began their married life in Virginia, where they worked on farms. In 1905, they returned to the Northeastern United States and settled in Eagle Bridge, New York. They had ten children, five of whom survived infancy. She embroidered pictures with yarn, until disabled by arthritis.

In her 1961 obituary, The New York Times said: "The simple realism, nostalgic atmosphere and luminous color with which Grandma Moses portrayed simple farm life and rural countryside won her a wide following. She was able to capture the excitement of winter's first snow, Thanksgiving preparations and the new, young green of oncoming spring... In person, Grandma Moses charmed wherever she went. A tiny, lively woman with mischievous gray eyes and a quick wit, she could be sharp-tongued with a sycophant and stern with an errant grandchild."

Moses' work has been a subject of numerous museum exhibitions worldwide and has been extensively merchandised, such as on greeting cards.

Early life

Anna Mary Robertson was born in Greenwich, New York on September 7, 1860; she was the third of ten children born to Margaret Shanahan Robertson and Russell King Robertson. She was raised with four sisters and five brothers. Her father ran a flax mill and was a farmer. She briefly attended a one-room school. That school is now the Bennington Museum in Vermont, which has the largest collection of her works in the United States. She was inspired to paint by taking art lessons at school. As a child, she started painting using lemon and grape juice to make colors for her "landscapes" and used ground ocher, grass, flour paste, slack lime, and sawdust.

At age 12, she left home and performed farm chores for a wealthy neighboring family. She continued to keep house, cook, and sew for wealthy families for 15 years. One of these families, the Whitesides, noticed her interest in their Currier and Ives prints and bought her chalk and wax crayons.

Marriage and children
At age 27, she worked on the same farm with Thomas Salmon Moses, a "hired man". They were married and established themselves near Staunton, Virginia where they spent nearly two decades, living and working in turn on five local farms. Four of them are The Bell Farm or Eakle Farm, The Dudley Farm, Mount Airy Farm (now included within Augusta County's Millway Place Industrial Park), and Mount Nebo. To supplement the family income at Mount Nebo, Anna made potato chips and churned butter from the milk of a cow that she purchased with her savings. Later, the couple bought a farm, Mount Airy, near Verona, Virginia; it was listed on the National Register of Historic Places in 2012. Having bought the house in January 1901, it was the first residence the family owned. They lived there until September 1902.

Five of the ten children born to them survived infancy. Although she loved living in the Shenandoah Valley, in 1905 Anna and Robert moved to a farm in Eagle Bridge, New York at her husband's urging. When Thomas Moses was about 67 years of age in 1927, he died of a heart attack, after which Anna's son Forrest helped her operate the farm. She never married again. She retired and moved to a daughter's home in 1936. She was known as either "Mother Moses" or "Grandma Moses", and although she first exhibited as "Mrs. Moses", the press dubbed her "Grandma Moses", and the nickname stuck.

Decorative arts
As a young wife and mother, Moses was creative in her home; for example, in 1918 she used housepaint to decorate a fireboard. Beginning in 1932, Moses made embroidered pictures of yarn for friends and family. She created quilted objects, a form of "hobby art". Lucy R. Lippard stated in "The Word in Their Hands" that she found "hobby art" to be "an activity so 'low' on the art lists that it still ranks way below 'folk art...'" She found that hobby art often involves reuse of otherwise discarded objects.

By the age of 76, Moses had developed arthritis, which made embroidery painful. Her sister Celestia suggested that painting would be easier for her, and this idea spurred Moses's painting career in her late 70s. Grandma Moses also told reporters that she turned to painting in order to create the postman's Christmas gift, seeing as it "was easier to make [a painting] than to bake a cake over a hot stove". Being practical, painted works would last longer than her embroidered compositions made of worsted wool, which risked being eaten by moths. Judith Stein noted that "her sense of accomplishment in her painting was rooted in her ability to make 'something from nothing'". When her right hand began to hurt, she switched to her left hand.

Art career

What appeared to be an interest in painting at a late age was actually a manifestation of a childhood dream. With no time in her difficult farm life to pursue painting, she was obliged to set aside her passion to paint. At age 92 she wrote, "I was quite small, my father would get me and my brothers white paper by the sheet. He liked to see us draw pictures, it was a penny a sheet and lasted longer than candy."

Style

Moses painted scenes of rural life from earlier days, which she called "old-timey" New England landscapes. Moses said that she would "get an inspiration and start painting; then I'll forget everything, everything except how things used to be and how to paint it so people will know how we used to live."  From her works of art, she omitted features of modern life, such as tractors and telephone poles.

Her early style is less individual and more realistic or primitive, with a lack of knowledge of, or perhaps rejection of, basic perspective. Initially she created simple compositions or copied existing images. As her career advanced, she created complicated, panoramic compositions of rural life.

She was a prolific painter, generating more than 1,500 canvasses in three decades. She initially charged $3 to $5 for a painting, depending upon its size, and as her fame increased her works were sold for $8,000 to $10,000. Her winter paintings are reminiscent of some of the known winter paintings of Pieter Bruegel the Elder, although she had never seen his work. A German fan said, "There emanates from her paintings a light-hearted optimism; the world she shows us is beautiful and it is good. You feel at home in all these pictures, and you know their meaning. The unrest and the neurotic insecurity of the present day make us inclined to enjoy the simple and affirmative outlook of Grandma Moses."

Initial exhibitions
During a visit to Hoosick Falls in 1938, Louis J. Caldor, an art collector who worked as an engineer in the state of New York, saw paintings made by Moses in the window of a drug store. He bought their supply and ten more from her Eagle Bridge house for $3 or $5 each. The next year, three Grandma Moses paintings were included in New York's Museum of Modern Art exhibition titled "Contemporary Unknown American Painters". Her first solo exhibition, "What a Farm Wife Painted", opened in New York in October 1940 at Otto Kallir's Galerie St. Etienne. A meet-and-greet with the artist and an exhibition of 50 paintings at Gimbel's Department Store was held next on November 15. Her art displays included samples of her baked goods and preserves that won Moses prizes at the county fair. Her third solo show in as many months, was held at the Whyte Gallery, Washington, D.C. In 1944, she was represented by the American British Art Center and the Galerie St. Etienne, which increased her sales. Her paintings were exhibited throughout Europe and the United States over the next 20 years. Otto Kallir established the Grandma Moses Properties, Inc. for her.

The paintings of Grandma Moses were used to publicize American holidays, including Thanksgiving, Christmas, and Mother's Day. A Mother's Day feature in True Confessions (1947) written by Eleanor Early noted how "Grandma Moses remains prouder of her preserves than of her paintings, and proudest of all of her four children, eleven grandchildren and four great-grandchildren." During the 1950s, her exhibitions broke attendance records around the world. Art historian Judith Stein noted: "A cultural icon, the spry, productive nonagenarian was continually cited as an inspiration for housewives, widows and retirees." Her paintings were reproduced on Hallmark greeting cards, tiles, fabrics, and ceramics. They were also used to market products, like coffee, lipstick, cigarettes, and cameras.

Acclaim
In 1950, the National Press Club cited her as one of the five most newsworthy women and the National Association of House Dress Manufacturers honored her as their 1951 Woman of the Year. When she reached 88, Mademoiselle magazine named her a "Young Woman of the Year". She was awarded two honorary doctoral degrees. The first was bestowed in 1949 from Russell Sage College and the second two years later from the Moore College of Art and Design.

President Harry S. Truman presented her with the Women's National Press Club trophy Award for outstanding accomplishment in art in 1949. Jerome Hill  directed the 1950 documentary of her life, which was nominated for an Academy Award. In 1952, she published her autobiography, My Life's History. In it she said "I look back on my life like a good day's work, it was done and I feel satisfied with it. I was happy and contented, I knew nothing better and made the best out of what life offered. And life is what we make it, always has been, always will be." In 1955, she appeared as a guest on See It Now, a television program hosted by Edward R. Murrow.

Later years and death
She was a member of the Society of Mayflower Descendants and Daughters of the American Revolution. Her 100th birthday was proclaimed "Grandma Moses Day" by New York Governor Nelson Rockefeller. LIFE magazine celebrated her birthday by featuring her on its September 19, 1960, cover. The children's book Grandma Moses Story Book was published in 1961. 

Grandma Moses died at age 101 on December 13, 1961, at the Health Center in Hoosick Falls, New York. She is buried there at the Maple Grove Cemetery. President John F. Kennedy memorialized her: "The death of Grandma Moses removed a beloved figure from American life. The directness and vividness of her paintings restored a primitive freshness to our perception of the American scene. Both her work and her life helped our nation renew its pioneer heritage and recall its roots in the countryside and on the frontier. All Americans mourn her loss." After her death, her work was exhibited in several large traveling exhibitions in the United States and abroad.

Legacy

A 1942 piece, The Old Checkered House, 1862, was appraised at the Memphis 2004 Antiques Roadshow. It was not as common as her winter landscapes. Originally purchased in the 1940s for under $10, the piece was assigned an insurance value of $60,000 by the appraiser, Alan Fausel.

In November 2006, her 1943 work Sugaring Off became her highest-selling work at US $1.2 million.

Otto Kallir of the Galerie St. Etienne gave her painting Fourth of July (1951) to the White House as a gift in 1952. The painting also appears on a U.S. commemorative stamp that was issued in Grandma Moses' honor in 1969.

The character Daisy "Granny" Moses (Irene Ryan) on The Beverly Hillbillies, was named as an homage to Grandma Moses, who died shortly before the series began.

Norman Rockwell and Grandma Moses were friends who lived over the Vermont-New York state border from each other. Moses lived in Eagle Bridge, New York and after 1938 the Rockwells had a house in nearby Arlington, Vermont. She appears on the far left edge in the Norman Rockwell painting Christmas Homecoming, which was printed on The Saturday Evening Posts December 25, 1948, cover.

Collections
This is a selection of the public collections of her work:
 Bennington Museum in Bennington, Vermont, holds the largest public collection of Moses's paintings
 Brooklyn Museum, New York City
 Figge Art Museum, Davenport, Iowa
 Hirshhorn Museum and Sculpture Garden, Washington D.C.
 Lauren Rogers Museum of Art, Laurel, Mississippi
 Maier Museum of Art at Randolph-Macon Woman's College, Virginia
 Memorial Art Gallery of the University of Rochester, New York
 Metropolitan Museum of Art, New York City
 Muscarelle Museum of Art, William & Mary, Williamsburg, Virginia
 National Museum of Women in the Arts, Washington D.C.
 The Phillips Collection, Washington D.C. 
 Smithsonian American Art Museum
 University of Iowa Museum of Art, Iowa City

Selected works
 Autumn in the Berkshires
 Black Horses, 1942
 Bondsville Fair, 1945
 Catching the Thanksgiving Turkey, San Diego Museum of Art
 Christmas, 1958, Oil and Tempura on Pressed Wood, Smithsonian American Art Museum
 Dividing of the Ways, 1947, oil and tempera on masonite, Collection American Folk Art Museum, New York
 English Cottage Flower Garden, embroidery
 Get Out the Sleigh, 1960, oil on pressed wood
 Grandma Moses Goes to the Big City, 1946, Oil on Canvas, Smithsonian American Art Museum
 Haying Time, 1945
 Home of the Hezekiah King, 1776, 1943, Phoenix Art Museum
 Home for Thanksgiving, 1952
 Hoosick Falls, 1944, Southern Vermont Arts Center
 Jack 'n Jill
 July Fourth, 1951
 My Hills of Home, Memorial Art Gallery of the University of Rochester, New York
 Out for Christmas Trees
 Rockabye, 1957, Grandma Moses with her grandchildren
 The Childhood Home of Anna Mary Robertson Moses, 1942
 Thanksgiving Turkey
 The Daughter's Homecoming, oil on pressed wood
 The Old Checkered House
 The Old Covered Bridge, The Wadsworth Atheneum Museum of Art, Hartford, Connecticut
 The Old Oaken Bucket
 The Red Checkered House
 Turkey in the Straw, private collection
 White Christmas
 Winter is Here, 1945

References

External links

 
 Jane Kallir, "Grandma Moses: The Artist Behind the Myth", The Clarion, Fall 1982.

1860 births
1961 deaths
American centenarians
American women painters
Folk artists
Naïve painters
Self-taught artists
People from Greenwich (town), New York
People from Hoosick, New York
19th-century American painters
20th-century American painters
19th-century American women artists
20th-century American women artists
Women centenarians
American embroiderers